Southwestern Law School is a private law school in Mid-Wilshire, Los Angeles.  It is accredited by the American Bar Association and enrolls nearly 1,000 students. Its campus includes the Bullocks Wilshire building, an art deco National Register of Historic Places landmark built in 1929. Southwestern is an independent law school with affiliation to the undergraduate program at California State University, Northridge.

History 

Southwestern Law School was founded on November 25, 1911, as the Southwestern College of Law. John J. Schumacher, its founder, intended the nonprofit institution to be a law school that reached out to women and minorities. The school is the second oldest law school in Los Angeles.  Southwestern received a university charter in 1913 after it expanded to include a number of other disciplines including a business school. Southwestern's first home was in the Union Oil Building in downtown Los Angeles, followed by a small campus on South Hill Street, where it existed for the ensuing decades.

The Great Depression and Second World War took a severe toll on the enrollment, and by the end of the 1930s the law school was the only school that remained. However, as veterans returned home the school experienced a surge of interest, and in 1974, the campus was moved to the school's current location on Westmoreland Avenue in the Wilshire Center area of Los Angeles.

It joined the Association of American Law Schools (AALS) in 1974. It is a member of the North American Consortium on Legal Education.

In 1994, Southwestern acquired the adjacent Bullocks Wilshire building, a historic landmark which was subsequently renovated to house the school's law library, classrooms, faculty offices, and court room and advocacy center.

Campus 

The campus is in the Koreatown area of the Mid-Wilshire district near downtown Los Angeles. The campus comprises the Westmoreland Building and the Bullocks Wilshire Building. Both house classrooms, administrative offices, and faculty offices. The Bullocks Wilshire Building also houses the Leigh Taylor Law Library (named for a former Dean of the law school), the Julian Dixon Courtroom and Advocacy Center, a fitness center, a dining area, and student lounges.

The Westmoreland Building is a typical campus building, while the Bullocks Wilshire Building is a fully renovated art deco landmark restored to its 1929 state, from the clocks on the walls to the "showcases" in the library.

As of fall semester 2013, Southwestern opened student housing "The Residences at 7th". The Residences at 7th include 133 units ranging from studio to two bedrooms housing 153 or more students.

Bar passage rate and rankings 
In July, 2022 results, 61% of Southwestern Law graduates taking the test for the first time passed the California State Bar, vs. 66.8% for all first-time takers and 75% for first-time takers who graduated from ABA-approved law schools in California.  Southwestern was ranked 147–193 in the 2022 U.S. News & World Report "Best Law Schools" rankings. The part-time program was ranked 43rd of 70. Southwestern has been ranked among the top entertainment law schools in The Hollywood Reporter.

Post-graduation employment 

According to Southwestern's official 2013 ABA-required disclosures, 38.3% of the Class of 2013 obtained full-time, long-term, JD-required employment nine months after graduation, excluding solo-practitioners. Southwestern's Law School Transparency under-employment score is 26.7%, indicating the percentage of the Class of 2013 unemployed, pursuing an additional degree, or working in a non-professional, short-term, or part-time job nine months after graduation.

According to the law professor blog, The Faculty Lounge, based on 2012 ABA data, 44.1% of graduates obtained full-time, long-term, positions requiring bar admission (i.e., jobs as lawyers), nine months after graduation, ranking 154th out of 197 law schools.

Costs 

The total cost of attendance (indicating the cost of tuition, fees, and living expenses) at Southwestern for the 2013–2014 academic year is $75,559. The Law School Transparency estimated debt-financed cost of attendance for three years is $293,914.

Curriculum

Juris Doctor (J.D.)

Full-time program (3 years) 
The traditional program is three academic years of full-time study that allows students to pursue a broad-based legal education with opportunities to focus on a particular area of the law, such as: entertainment, criminal, international, business, family, or tax law, among others.

Part-time programs 
The evening program is four academic years of part-time study designed for working professionals and other students who are unable to devote full-time to the study of law.

Part-time day 
The "PLEAS" (Part-time Legal Education Alternative at Southwestern) program is a 4-year part-time day curriculum designed for students with child or elder care responsibilities.

SCALE Program (2 years) 
Established in 1974, Southwestern founded the first two-year J.D. course of study offered at an American Bar Association-approved law school. SCALE (Southwestern's Conceptual Approach to Legal Education) is a unique, accelerated J.D. program. Its intensive schedule is intended prepare students for the rigors of practicing law. Low student-faculty ratio in the classroom promotes cooperative teaching and intellectual discussion among classmates. The program has a limited enrollment.

Joint degree programs 

Southwestern has joined forces with the Drucker Graduate School of Management to create dual-degree programs. Students at Southwestern and the Drucker School, part of Claremont Graduate University (CGU), will be able to earn a J.D. and Master of Business Administration (M.B.A.), a J.D. and Master of Arts in management (M.A.M.), or a J.D. and Executive Master of Business Administration (E.M.B.A.). TB.A./J.D. Joint Degree Program

Under a partnership agreement with California State University, Northridge in which students will be able to simultaneously earn their Bachelor of Arts and Juris Doctor in six years instead of seven years.  Starting in fall 2014, the program enrolls up to 35 incoming CSUN freshmen.  Students spend three years completing their undergraduate course requirements and their first year of law school will also count as their fourth year of undergraduate education.  Students in the program also receive a $10,000 Wildman/Schumacher entering student scholarship.  The scholarship can be renewed provided that a minimum 2.7 GPA is maintained.  In order to qualify for the program incoming freshmen must have a minimum 3.0 GPA and have received either a minimum score of 25 on the ACT or 1140 on the SAT.  In addition, students in the program must maintain a 3.40 GPA and receive a 156 or higher on the LSAT.  According to Dean Austen Parrish, the program will help young, promising undergraduate students pursue a legal education.

Master of Laws (LL.M.)

General studies 
Southwestern offers an individualized LL.M. program for students who have already earned a law degree and are interested in furthering their legal education. The program allows students to choose their own focus of study, from American Legal Systems to International Law to Technology Innovation and Commercialization.

Advocacy training 
In 2006, Southwestern was awarded a federal grant to train Mexican lawyers and law faculty in advocacy skills as part of a USAID effort to assist Mexican legal reform.

Publications

Southwestern Law Review 
Law Review is a student-edited quarterly journal that publishes scholarly articles and commentary on a variety of legal issues in California and federal law contributed by prominent jurists, practitioners, law professors, and student members of the Law Review staff. Annual Symposia and the Distinguished Lecture Series are sponsored by Law Review. These programs feature prominent members of the legal community lecturing on areas of legal expertise and participating in panel discussions on relevant emerging and contemporary legal issues.

Southwestern Journal of International Law 
Formerly the Southwestern Journal of Law and Trade in the Americas, the journal focuses on issues of international law and trade, publishing scholarly articles and notes exploring areas such as international insolvency, environmental law, international trade issues, NAFTA, international arbitration, privatization in Central and South American countries, immigration, human rights, and international crime. On October 3, 2008, the Southwestern Journal of International Law hosted one of the first U.S. conferences on Arctic sovereignty, featuring legal scholars from both the United States and Canada.

Journal of International Media & Entertainment Law 
In association with the American Bar Association Forum on Communications Law and Forum on Entertainment and Sports Industries, the Journal of International Media & Entertainment Law explores the complex and unsettled legal issues surrounding the creation and distribution of media and entertainment products on a worldwide basis, which necessarily implicate the laws, customs, and practices of multiple jurisdictions. Additionally, it examines the impact of the Internet and other technologies, the often conflicting laws affecting those issues, and the legal ramifications of widely divergent cultural views of privacy, defamation, intellectual property, and government regulation.

Clinical programs 
The law school has nine clinical programs and two practicum programs.

Study abroad 
 Universidad Torcuato di Tella, Buenos Aires, Argentina (summer and semester)
 London, England (summer)
 Vancouver, British Columbia, Canada (summer)
 Guanajuato, Mexico (summer)
 University of Western Ontario, Ontario, Canada (semester)
 The Hague University of Applied Sciences, The Hague, Netherlands

Noted people

Alumni 
Southwestern's 10,000 alumni include public officials as well as founders of law firms and general counsels of corporations.

Politics and government 
 Tom Bradley – 38th Mayor of Los Angeles (1973–93)
 Murray Chotiner, political strategist, campaign manager for Richard M. Nixon
 Marcia Clark – Lead prosecutor in the O. J. Simpson murder case (1995)
 Julian Dixon – California State Assembly (1973–78), U.S. House of Representatives (1979–2000)
 Denise Moreno Ducheny – California State Assembly (1994–2000), California State Senate (2003–present)
 Matt Fong – California State Treasurer (1995–99)
 Jim Gibbons – 28th Governor of Nevada (2007–11), U.S. House of Representatives (1997–2006)
 Cynthia B. Hall – New Mexico Public Regulation Commission (2017–present)
 Bill Paparian – Pasadena City Council (1987–99) including serving as 52nd Mayor of Pasadena, California (1995–97), Green Party nominee for the U.S. House of Representatives (2006)
 Robert Philibosian – 38th Los Angeles County District Attorney (1981–84)
 Norris Poulson – California State Assembly (1939–43), 36th Mayor of Los Angeles (1954–61)
 Ira Reiner – 39th Los Angeles County District Attorney (1984–92)
 Edward R. Roybal – Los Angeles City Council (1949–62), U.S. House of Representatives (1963–93),
 Gordon H. Smith – U.S. Senate (1997–2009)
 Tom Umberg – California State Assembly (1991–95, 2005–07); deputy director, Office of National Drug Control Policy (1997–2000).
 Sam Yorty – California State Assembly (1937–41, 1949–50), U.S. House of Representatives (1951–55), 37th Mayor of Los Angeles (1961–73)
James O. Page – Father of Emergency Medical Services, Battalion Chief, Los Angeles County Fire Department (1959–1975)

Judiciary 
 Stanley Mosk – former Justice of the California Supreme Court
 Ronald S. W. Lew – United States District Court for the Central District of California
 Paul Peek – former Justice of the California Supreme Court
 Vaino Spencer – first African-American woman judge in California
 Otis D. Wright II – United States District Court for the Central District of California

Entertainment industry 
 Jean Casarez – Court TV correspondent
 Staci Keanan – actress
 Kevin A. Ross – host and producer on America's Court with Judge Ross
 Camille Vasquez - attorney in Depp v. Heard defamation lawsuit

Sports industry 
 Chris Bahr – Olympian, NFL kicker
 Jeff Borris – Sports agent
 Donald Sterling – Former owner of the NBA Los Angeles Clippers

Legal practice 
 Roslyn Chasan – women’s rights attorney, judge pro-tempore, won largest settlement in history of Palos Verdes
 William John Cox – public interest attorney (Holocaust denial case and publication of Dead Sea Scrolls), author and political activist
 Daniel Horowitz – high-profile defense attorney and legal analyst
 Daniel M. Petrocelli – Partner, O’Melveny & Myers. Notable clients include Fred Goldman and Jeffrey Skilling
 Stefani Schaeffer – defense attorney and winner of Donald Trump's The Apprentice 6
 Marvin Mitchelson – high-profile – divorce attorney – celebrity lawyer who pioneered the concept of palimony
 Vicki Roberts – attorney, on-air legal commentator, television and film personality
 Shawn Holley – high-profile criminal defense attorney, civil litigator and legal analyst. Notable clients include O. J. Simpson, Michael Jackson, Tupac Shakur, Geronimo Pratt, Snoop Dogg, Reggie Bush, Lindsay Lohan, Paris Hilton and Kim Kardashian.
 Camille Vasquez -high-profile attorney specialized on plaintiff-side defamation suits. Notable clients include Johnny Depp

Authors 
 Richard T. Williamson – non-fiction author of books on asset protection, estate planning, and capital gains tax planning
 Kenneth G. Eade – fiction author of legal thriller, and spy fiction.

Religion 
 Howard W. Hunter – 14th President of the Church of Jesus Christ of Latter-day Saints

Faculty

Dean 

 Darby Dickerson (2021-)
 Susan Westerberg Prager (2013-2021)
 Austen L. Parrish (2012-2013)
 Bryant G. Garth (2005-2012)
 Leigh H. Taylor (1986-2012)

Current faculty 
 Kevin J. Greene - John J. Schumacher Chair, Professor of Law
 Faisal Kutty - lawyer, academic, writer, public speaker and human rights activist

Former faculty 
 Christopher Darden – prosecutor in the O. J. Simpson murder case
 James Rogan – former judge and member of the House of Representatives who was a House Manager in the Senate impeachment trial of Bill Clinton

References

External links 
 

Universities and colleges in Los Angeles
ABA-accredited law schools in California
Educational institutions established in 1911
Koreatown, Los Angeles
Mid-Wilshire, Los Angeles
Art Deco architecture in California
Private universities and colleges in California
1911 establishments in California
Southwestern Law School